Michalis Tsoumanis (born 9 October 2002) is a Greek professional footballer who plays as a forward for Super League 2 club Iraklis Larissa on loan from AEL.

Career
Tsoumanis was born in Larissa. He started his career in the youth squad of AEL where he played in the Greek Super League Youth U-19  Championship. In October 2020, he moved to AO Sellana, a 3rd League club. On 9 July 2021, Tsoumanis joined AEL on a free transfer signing a three-year contract. He scored his first professional goal against Xanthi F.C. on his debut, on 29 December 2021, having played for only three minutes as a substitute.

References

2002 births
Living people
Footballers from Larissa
Greek footballers
Association football forwards
Gamma Ethniki players
Super League Greece players
Super League Greece 2 players
Athlitiki Enosi Larissa F.C. players